The 2010 PFF League (PFFL) was the 7th season of second tier of Pakistan Football Federation. The season started on 22 November 2010 and concluded on 17 December 2010.

Teams
A total of 18 teams contested the league. 8 teams played via Departmental route and 10 played from club route.

Relegation (pre-season)
Baloch Quetta and PMC Athletico were relegated from 2009-10 Pakistan Premier League season. 

Teams relegated from the 2009-10 Pakistan Premier League
Baloch Quetta
 PMC Athletico

Club phase

Region round

Ravi will face Al-Hilal and Afghan Sports in Group B.

Round One
Baloch Quetta, Muslim & Wohaib bye to Super League.

Group A

University won both games on walkover.
University qualified to Super League.

Group B

Afghan Sports qualified to Super League.

Super League (Club)
All matches for Club phase of Super League were held in Lahore.

Departmental phase

Group stage

Group A
All matches held in Karachi.

Pakistan Police and Pakistan Steel qualified to Super League.

Group B
All matches held in Islamabad.

Pakistan Railways and Pakistan Television qualified to Super League.

Super League (Department)
All matches held in Lahore:

Final

Statistics

Top scorers

Hat-tricks

References

External links
 FPDC 2010-11 PFF League
 RSSSF 2010-11 PFF League

Pakistan Football Federation League seasons
1
Pakistan